Smith Lands is an island platformed METRORail light rail station in Houston, Texas, United States. The station was opened on January 1, 2004 and is operated by the Metropolitan Transit Authority of Harris County, Texas (METRO). The station is located south of the Texas Medical Center at the intersection of Greenbriar Drive and Colonnade Drive; Old Spanish Trail crosses Greenbriar Drive approximately one block south of the station.

Smith Lands Station feeds commuter traffic into the Texas Medical Center area, and services the adjacent Smith Lands commuter parking facility as well as several nearby apartment and condominium complexes. Other facilities located nearby include Texas Woman's Hospital, M.D. Anderson Cancer Center's Proton Therapy Center (see also: proton therapy) and office buildings serving several oil companies.

There is talk of building a parking garage, and using the surface lots as a redevelopment project, including residential units, office and maybe a hotel.

References

METRORail stations
Railway stations in the United States opened in 2004
2004 establishments in Texas
Railway stations in Harris County, Texas